Moghisabad (also Romanized as Moghīs̄ābād; also known as Sheyūr and Sheyvar) is a village in Shaab Jereh Rural District, Toghrol Al Jerd District, Kuhbanan County, Kerman Province, Iran. At the 2006 census, its population was 20, in 6 families.

References 

Populated places in Kuhbanan County